The Italy women's national under-20 basketball team is a national basketball team of Italy, administered by the Italian Basketball Federation. It represents the country in women's international under-20 basketball competitions.

FIBA U20 Women's European Championship participations

See also
Italy women's national basketball team
Italy women's national under-19 basketball team
Italy men's national under-20 basketball team

References

External links
Archived records of Italy team participations

Basketball in Italy
Basketball
Women's national under-20 basketball teams